The Bloomsbury Historic District is a neighborhood and national historic district located near downtown Raleigh, North Carolina. Located north of the Five Points intersection, the boundaries include Fairview Road, St. Mary's Street, Byrd Street, Sunset Drive, and Whitaker Mill Road. The residential district encompasses 439 contributing buildings and was developed between about 1914 and 1950.  It includes notable examples of Tudor Revival and Bungalow / American Craftsman style architecture.

In May 2002, Bloomsbury was listed on the National Register of Historic Places.

See also
 Five Points Historic Neighborhoods (Raleigh, North Carolina)
 List of Registered Historic Places in North Carolina

External links
 National Register Historic Districts in Raleigh, North Carolina, RHDC
 Bloomsbury Historic District, RHDC

References

Historic districts on the National Register of Historic Places in North Carolina
Tudor Revival architecture in North Carolina
Neighborhoods in Raleigh, North Carolina
National Register of Historic Places in Raleigh, North Carolina